The 2020–21 Coupe de France preliminary rounds, Auvergne-Rhône-Alpes was the qualifying competition to decide which teams from the leagues of the Auvergne-Rhône-Alpes region of France took part in the main competition from the seventh round.

A total of sixteen teams qualified from the Auvergne-Rhône-Alpes Preliminary rounds. In 2019–20, FC Limonest Saint-Didier progressed the furthest in the main competition, reaching the round of 16, before losing to Dijon 2–1 after extra time.

Schedule
A total of 945 teams from the region entered the competition. The draw, made on 27 July 2020, required a Preliminary round, which took place on 30 August 2020, and which saw 370 teams enter the competition, from the District leagues, division 2 and below. The ties for the first round on 6 September 2020 were also preassigned, which saw a further 475 teams enter, from the higher District leagues and Regional 3. The draw for the second round was made on 3 September 2020, and saw the entry of 48 Regional 2 teams.

The third round draw, which saw the 27 Regional 1 teams and 10 Championnat National 3 teams enter, was made on 15 September 2020. The fourth round draw, which saw the Championnat National 2 teams enter, was made on 24 September 2020. The fifth round draw, featuring the teams from Championnat National, was made on 8 October 2020. The sixth round draw was made on 22 October 2020.

Preliminary round
These matches were played on 29 and 30 August 2020.

First round
These matches were played on 5 and 6 September 2020, with one postponed to 13 September.

Second round
These matches were played on 12 and 13 September 2020, with two postponed to 16 and 20 September 2020.

Third round
These matches were played on 19 and 20 September 2020, with one postponed until 27 September 2020.

Fourth round
These matches were played on 3 and 4 October 2020.

Fifth round
These matches were played on 17 and 18 October 2020.

Sixth round
These matches were played on 30 and 31 January 2021.

References

Preliminary rounds